The Cuban coney (Geocapromys columbianus) is an extinct species of rodent in the subfamily Capromyinae. It was endemic to Cuba.
Its natural habitats were lowlands moist forests, xeric shrublands and rocky areas. Some scientists indicate that this species may have survived and coexisted with introduced species from the Old World until approximately 1500, while others indicate that it became extinct earlier in the Holocene.

Sources
 Gippoliti, S. 2002. 

Geocapromys
Holocene extinctions
Extinct rodents
Extinct animals of Cuba
Taxonomy articles created by Polbot
Fossil taxa described in 1892
Mammals described in 1892
Mammals of the Caribbean
Endemic fauna of Cuba